Magnesia may refer to:

Magnesia (hypothetical city), a future colony of Knossos, imagined in Plato's Laws
Magnesia (regional unit), the southeastern area of Thessaly in central Greece
Ancient Magnesia, a historical region of Greece with borders differing from the modern regional unit
Magnesia ad Sipylum, a city of Lydia, now Manisa in Turkey
Battle of Magnesia, 190 BC, the concluding battle of the Roman–Seleucid War
Magnesia on the Maeander, an ancient Greek city in Anatolia
Magnesia Prefecture, a former prefecture of Greece

Chemistry 
Magnesium oxide
Periclase or magnesia, a natural mineral of magnesium oxide

See also
Magnesian limestone (disambiguation)
Magnesium
Milk of magnesia, a suspension of magnesium hydroxide